During the 1957–58 English football season, Everton F.C. competed in the Football League First Division.

Final League Table

P = Matches played; W = Matches won; D = Matches drawn; L = Matches lost; F = Goals for; A = Goals against; GA = Goal average; GD = Goal difference; Pts = Points

 Most of the Manchester United squad was lost in the Munich air disaster, on the 6th Feb 1958.

Results

Football League First Division

FA Cup

Squad

References

Everton F.C. seasons
Everton F.C. season